Howaldtswerke-Deutsche Werft (often abbreviated HDW) is a German shipbuilding company, headquartered in Kiel. It is part of the ThyssenKrupp Marine Systems (TKMS) group, owned by ThyssenKrupp. The Howaldtswerke shipyard was founded in Kiel in 1838 and merged with Hamburg-based Deutsche Werft to form Howaldtswerke-Deutsche Werft (HDW) in 1968. The company's shipyard was formerly used by Friedrich Krupp Germaniawerft until the end of World War II.

History

HDW was founded October 1, 1838 in Kiel by engineer August Howaldt and entrepreneur Johann Schweffel under the name Maschinenbauanstalt und Eisengießerei Schweffel & Howaldt (Machine Factory and Iron Foundry Schweffel & Howaldt), initially building boilers.

The first steam engine for naval purposes was built in 1849 for the Von der Tann, a gunboat for the small navy of Schleswig-Holstein.  In 1850, the company built an early submarine, Brandtaucher, designed by Wilhelm Bauer. It had been intended to build the boat in Rendsburg but Danish forces advanced too close during the First Schleswig War, so construction was moved to Kiel.

The first ship built under the company's new name Howaldtswerke was a small steamer, named  Vorwärts, built in 1865. Business expanded rapidly as Germany became a maritime power and, by the start of the 20th century, around 390 ships had been completed.

In 1892 the company started a subsidiary in Austro-Hungarian Fiume on the coast of the Adriatic Sea. The subsidiary closed ten years later but the yard remains open under the name 3. Maj.

With Kiel being one of the two main bases of the Kaiserliche Marine, the shipyard also benefited much from navy maintenance, repair and construction contracts. During World War I the company also built a number of U-boats. By 1937, the company had yards in Kiel and in Hamburg, and was taken over by the Kriegsmarine. During World War II, Howaldtswerke built 33 VIIC U-boats in Hamburg and 31 in Kiel.

After the end of World War II, Howaldtswerke was the only major shipyard in Kiel that was not dismantled. The yard flourished during the "economic miracle" of the 1960s, with the construction of freighters and tankers, and again expanded by opening a shipyard in Hamburg. Howaldtswerke merged with Deutsche Werft in Hamburg in 1968, and the company took the new name Howaldtswerke-Deutsche Werft (HDW). Pressure from cheaper competitors in Japan and South Korea caused the closure of the Hamburg yard in 1985.

In March 2002, the American financial investor One Equity Partner (OEP) took over the majority of Babcock AG at HDW. Shortly after that, Babcock AG had to file for insolvency and called for a reserved transaction, but the OEP was able to avoid this.

In January 2005, HDW became a subsidiary of ThyssenKrupp Marine Systems (TKMS), which also part-owned Kockums of Malmö, Sweden and 24.9% of Hellenic Shipyards Co. of Skaramangas, Greece. The group employs around 6,600 workers. In 2009, HDW worked with Kockums and Northrop Grumman to offer a  derivative in the American Focused Mission Vessel Study, a precursor to the Littoral combat ship program.

In July 2011, TKMS announced that it has confirmed an existing deal to sell the civilian shipbuilding assets of HDW Gaarden to Abu Dhabi MAR.

Ships built by HDW (selection)

Civilian

  (1924)
  (1954), luxury yacht conversion from naval vessel for Aristotle Onassis
  (1968), nuclear powered freighter
  (1975), cruiseferry
  (1976), cruiseferry
  (1981), cruiseferry
  (1981), cruise ship
  (1982), research icebreaker
  (1987), cruise ship
  (2001), fast ropax ferry
  (2001), fast ropax ferry
  (2001), fast ropax ferry
  (2002), fast ropax ferry
  (2002), fast ropax ferry

Naval

Battleships
  (1911)
  (1913)
  (1916)

Frigates

 , a 
 , two frigates built for the Royal Malaysian Navy
 , frigates built for the Colombian Navy
 
 
 , a

Corvettes
 s

Submarines (U-boats)

 Type 201 submarines
 Type 205 submarines
 Type 206 submarines
 Type 209 submarines
 Type U 209PN submarines
 Type 212 submarines
 Type 214 submarines
 Type 216 submarines (Proposed design)
 Type 218 submarines
 Type 800 submarines

Gunboats
  (built (only) by Howaldtswerke as Diogenes, a steamer (1881))

See also
 ThyssenKrupp

Notes

External links

 HDW 
 ThyssenKrupp Marine Systems
 Kockums 
 Hellenic Shipyards Co.
 USS Topeka
 

Kiel
Shipbuilding companies of Germany
Defence companies of Germany
Military vehicle manufacturers
Companies established in 1838
Companies based in Kiel
Manufacturing companies established in 1838
1838 establishments in Schleswig-Holstein
German corporate subsidiaries